Killwangen-Spreitenbach is a railway station in the municipality of Killwangen in the Swiss canton of Aargau. As the name suggests, the station also serves the adjacent municipality of Spreitenbach.

The station is located on the Zurich to Olten main line, just east of  the point where the newer route via the Heitersberg Tunnel diverges from the original line via Baden. The station is served by services S11 and S12 of the Zurich S-Bahn.

In 2022, the station is planned to become the western terminus of the Limmattal light rail line from Zürich Altstetten station, providing a more local service along the Limmat Valley.

References

External links 

 

Railway stations in the canton of Aargau
Swiss Federal Railways stations
Spreitenbach
Railway stations in Switzerland opened in 1848